Alles wieder offen is the tenth studio album by the German experimental band Einstürzende Neubauten. It was released on 19 October 2007 in Europe and 6 November in America. The title translated into English is "Everything Open Again".

Track listing
 "Die Wellen" ("Waves") – 3:47 	
 "Nagorny Karabach" ("Nagorno-Karabakh")– 4:25 	
 "Weil weil weil" ("Because Because Because") – 4:57 	
 "Ich hatte ein Wort" ("I Had a Word") – 4:19 	
 "Von Wegen" ("Of Ways") – 5:36 	
 "Let's Do It a Dada" – 5:52 
 "Alles wieder offen" (Everything Open Again") – 4:14
 "Unvollständigkeit" ("Incompleteness") – 9:01 	 
 "Susej" – 4:47 	
 "Ich warte" ("I'm Waiting") – 6:07

Supporter edition
This version of the album was sent to fans who paid to participate in Einstürzende Neubauten's Phase III supporter project. The supporter version is an expanded edition of the album and some copies also include a DVD.

 "Die Wellen" – 3:48
 "Nagorny Karabach" – 4:25
 "Weil weil weil" – 4:57
 "Ich hatte ein Wort" – 4:20
 "Von Wegen" – 5:38
 "Let's Do It a Dada" – 5:54
 "Wenn dann" ("If Then") – 3:11
 "Alles wieder offen" – 4:14
 "Unvollständigkeit" – 9:05
 "Venuskolonie" ("Venus Colony") – 8:35
 "Blue Ice" – 1:52
 "Birth Lunch Death" – 3:23
 "Susej" – 4:49
 "Ich warte" – 6:09

References

External links
 Track listing from alles-wieder-offen.com
 Einstürzende Neubauten official site
 Alles wieder offen at Discogs

Einstürzende Neubauten albums
2007 albums